Mishler is a former settlement in Portage County, in the U.S. state of Ohio. It was located in the southern part of Suffield Township along Mishler Road, east of present-day Ohio State Route 43.

History
A post office called Mishler was established in 1882, and remained in operation until 1917. The Mishler family settled at the site in the mid-19th century.

References

Unincorporated communities in Portage County, Ohio
Unincorporated communities in Ohio